The 2021–22 season was Scunthorpe United's 123rd year in their history and third consecutive season in League Two. Along with the league, the club was also competing in the FA Cup, the EFL Cup, the EFL Trophy and the Lincolnshire Senior Cup. The season covered the period from 1 July 2021 to 30 June 2022.

Pre-season friendlies
The Iron announced they would have friendlies against Barton Town, Farsley Celtic, Burton Albion, Hull City, Lincoln City and AFC Wimbledon as part of the club's pre-season preparations.

Competitions

League Two

League table

Results summary

Results by matchday

Matches
Scunthorpe's league fixtures were revealed on 24 June 2021.

FA Cup

Scunthorpe were drawn at home to Doncaster Rovers in the first round.

EFL Cup

United were drawn away to Barrow in the first round.

EFL Trophy

Iron were drawn into Northern Group E alongside Doncaster Rovers, Manchester City U21s and Rotherham United. On July 9, the matches for the group stages was finalised.

Transfers

Transfers in

Loans in

Loans out

Transfers out

Notes

References

Scunthorpe United
Scunthorpe United F.C. seasons